WGMY (107.1 FM) is a Top 40 (CHR) radio station in the Tallahassee, Florida, market owned by iHeartMedia.  Its studios and transmitter are located separately on the northside of Tallahassee.

History
The station's original call-letters were WLOR - LOR for "Land of Roses".  It morphed into country formatted "South 107" with call letters WSTT serving Thomasville and Thomas County, Georgia.  In 1990, the station was granted an upgrade to full C1 status.  Its new 100,000 watt signal from the tower of Tallahassee's WTWC television, between Tallahassee and Thomasville, gave the station full Tallahassee market coverage.  The station's studios moved to NE Capital Circle in Tallahassee and the call letters were changed to WSNI for Sunny 107.  The new format was 1960s and 1970s based oldies - a format that had not been done live in the Tallahassee market.

Bob Walker from WCKT in Ft. Myers was hired as the station's first PD.  Bob and Carol Chastain from sister station WTSH in Rome Georgia were the first morning team.  Joe Chrysdale formerly of Florida Radio Networks was the first midday jock and April Crowley formerly of WGLF later assumed the shift. Dan Murray from WCGQ in Columbus, Georgia was the afternoon drive talent, Charles Kinney from WPAP in Panama City hosted nights and James "The General" Sherman hosted over-nights.

When Chastain left to host mid-days at cross-town Kix 100, market veteran Sara Michaels who had co-hosted mornings at WBGM (now WBZE) before moving to Detroit to work for ABC news - was hired to co-host mornings with Walker.  The new "Bob and Sara in the Morning" program included Tim Bryant from WJAD in Bainbridge and former WCTV-TV sports anchor Jim Loftus hosting sports.  The show endeared itself to listeners while Michael's toddler daughter underwent open-heart surgery.  Michaels shared on-going details with WSNI listeners and talked about the strength of community she and her family felt from their thoughts and prayers.

In 1997, the station was sold to Paxson Communications and soon after to current owner iHeartMedia. (then-called "Clear Channel Communications").  Studios were moved to the current John Knox Road location and the station's "Sunny" name was dropped in favor of "Cool 107," WOKL.  Steven Christian from crosstown Z-Rock 106, now WQTL, replaced Bob Walker as morning show host. Steve and Sara continued the strong morning show tradition even as Clear Channel Communications morphed the station to Soft AC as Magic 107.1 with new call letters WTLY.

In 2009 the station began using the popular "My" moniker as "My 107.1" WGMY with syndicated morning show host Elvis Duran and a Hot AC music format.

On September 16, 2011, WGMY changed their format to CHR, branded as "107.1 Hit Music Now".

On February 14, 2014, WGMY rebranded as "107.1 Kiss FM".

On June 13, 2022, WGMY added the Black Information Network to its HD3 subchannel, fed by W262CC on 100.3.

Notable alumni

 Bob Walker (currently PD at WCTK Cat Country 98.1 in Providence)
 Sara Michaels
 Steve Christian
 April Crowley
 Dan Murray
 Charles Kinney
 Tim Bryant (currently at WGAU in Athens, GA)
 Jim Loftus
 "Uncle" Chuck Ryor
 Christine Seymour
 Steve Michaels
 Jon Edwards
 James "The General" Sherman

References

External links

GMY
Radio stations established in 1971
1971 establishments in Georgia (U.S. state)
IHeartMedia radio stations
Contemporary hit radio stations in the United States